Independents 4 Change is a left-wing Irish political party.

History 
The political grouping registered as a political party since 2014. It was previously known as Independents for Equality Movement.

The party adopted its current name in September 2015, after the establishment of the Right2Change electoral alliance, which its candidates in the 2016 general election subscribed.

Within the 32nd Dáil, I4C took advantage of revised Dáil standing orders to form their own technical group, which also included three Independent TDs who were not members of the party itself: Catherine Connolly, Thomas Pringle, and Maureen O'Sullivan.

Tommy Broughan left the party on 26 July 2016.

In 2016 Ruth Nolan, a member of South Dublin County Council for Lucan who had been elected for People Before Profit, joined Independents 4 Change.

In May 2020, Joan Collins left I4C to found a new party called Right to Change, leaving the party with no TDs.

Electoral history
Four candidates contested the 2014 local elections for the group in each of the local electoral areas in Wexford County Council. None of them were elected.

Mick Wallace, Clare Daly, Joan Collins, and Tommy Broughan, and councillor Barry Martin contested the 2016 general election for Independents 4 Change, with Broughan, Collins, Daly and Wallace being elected.

At the 2019 European Parliament election, Clare Daly and Mick Wallace were elected as MEPs. Three councilors were elected for Independents 4 Change in the local elections held on the same day, including former Labour TD from Sligo, and longtime Independent Socialist councillor Declan Bree.

In the 2020 general election, Independents 4 Change returned one TD, Joan Collins in Dublin South-Central.

General elections

Local elections

European elections

References

2014 establishments in Ireland
Left-wing politics in Ireland
Political parties established in 2014
Political parties in the Republic of Ireland
Socialist parties in Ireland